Pavon Prison (Granja Penal de Pavón) is a prison in Guatemala. It is located outside the town of Fraijanes near Guatemala City. It is a part of the Dirección General del Sistema Penitenciario de Guatemala.

It was built in the late-1970s and over time it became overcrowded and authorities decided to only control the perimeters of the prison and let the prisoners run the interior on their own. Since 1996, a society developed, with cocaine operations run by Colombian drug lords incarcerated there.

Authorities regain control
On Monday September 25, 2006, 3000 police officers and military forces overran the prison and reestablished authority. This led to the death of seven inmates. Among those killed was Luis Zepeda, a leader of the inmates and the head of the prison government.

Capital punishment
Pavon Prison houses the Guatemalan death row and an execution chamber to carry out executions by lethal injection.

Executed inmates 

 Manuel Martínez Coronado: Mass murderer
 Amilcar Cetino Perez and Tomas Cerrate Hernandez: Convicted of kidnapping and murdering a businesswoman

References

External links
"Inmates ran prison for 10 years." Sydney Morning Herald. September 30, 2006.

Prisons in Guatemala
Guatemala Department